Quentin Cornette (born 17 January 1994) is a French professional footballer who plays as a striker for Le Havre. He previously played for Montpellier and Amiens.

Club career
Cornette is a youth exponent from Montpellier HSC. He made his Ligue 1 debut on 29 August 2015 against Troyes AC.

He joined Le Havre AC in summer 2020.

References

1994 births
Living people
People from La Ciotat
Sportspeople from Bouches-du-Rhône
French footballers
Association football forwards
Montpellier HSC players
Amiens SC players
Le Havre AC players
Ligue 1 players
Ligue 2 players
Championnat National 2 players
Championnat National 3 players
Footballers from Provence-Alpes-Côte d'Azur